Ojo Amos Olatunde (born 14 February 1963), is a Nigerian architect and the current clerk to the National Assembly of Nigeria since 30 September 2020, he previously served as the acting clerk from 17 July 2020 when he replaced Mohammed Sani-Omolori.

Early life and education
Ojo was born in Ilobu, Irepodun, Oyo State, Nigeria. He had his secondary school education at Ilobu Secondary Commercial Grammar School, where he graduated in 1983. From 1985 to 1990, he went to Obafemi Awolowo University where he graduated with a degree in architecture, before preceding to obtain a master's degree in 1992 from the same university.

Career
Ojo started his career in private practice, before joining the national assembly of Nigeria in 2004 as the chief architect of department of estate and works. He was promoted to the position of assistant director, after which he became the deputy director and then director. He is a member of Nigerian Institute of Architect, NIA and the Architects Registration Council of Nigeria, ARCON.

Clerk to the national assembly of Nigeria
On 17 July 2020, Ojo was appointed as the acting clerk to the national assembly of Nigeria to replace Mohammed Sani-Omolori. On 30 September 2020, his appointment was made permanent.

References

Living people
1963 births
People from Osun State
Nigerian civil servants
Obafemi Awolowo University alumni
Nigerian architects